John Bolt is  an American-Dutch Reformed theologian. He is a professor emeritus of systematic theology at Calvin Theological Seminary in Grand Rapids, Michigan. He is the author and editor of several books. He edited Herman Bavinck's Gereformeerde Dogmatiek into English as Reformed Dogmatics. Bavinck influenced him into theological method.

Education
John Bolt was born in 1947 in Grootegast, the Netherlands; immigrated to Canada at the age of three; and grew up in Ladner, a suburb south of Vancouver, British Columbia. He is a professor emeritus of systematic theology at Calvin Theological Seminary, in Grand Rapids, Michigan.
John Bolt did his undergraduate work at Simon Fraser University and Calvin College and earned a Bachelor of Science degree in 1970. From Calvin Theological Seminary, he achieved a bachelor's degree in Theology in 1973 and a Master of Theology Degree in 1977. He completed his Ph.D. in Theology at University of St. Michael's College, in Toronto, in 1982.

Works
 Economic Shalom (2013)
 Bavinck on the Christian Life: Following Jesus in Faithful Service (2015)
 Orthodoxy and orthopraxis in the Reformed community today (ed., Christian Reformed perspectives, 1985)
 Christian and Reformed Today
 Five Studies in the Thought of Herman Bavinck (2012)
 A Theological Analysis of Herman Bavinck's Two Essays on the Imitatio Christi: Between Pietism and Modernism (2013)
 The Christian Story and the Christian School
 Christian and Reformed Today
 The Christian Story and the Christian School
 Herman Bavinck: The Man and the Mind 
 How Christianity Transformed Our Understanding of History

See also
 Herman Bavinck

References

External links
 
 
 

Year of birth missing (living people)
Living people
American Calvinist and Reformed theologians
Calvin University alumni
Calvin Theological Seminary alumni
University of St. Michael's College alumni
20th-century Calvinist and Reformed theologians
21st-century Calvinist and Reformed theologians
Calvin Theological Seminary faculty